Ilya Belyaev (born 9 August 1990) is a Russian tennis player playing on the ATP Challenger Tour. On November 8, 2010, he reached his highest ATP singles ranking of World No. 284, whilst his highest doubles ranking of 248 was reached on November 22, 2010. He is coached by Mikhail Chesalov.

Challenger finals

Doubles: 1 (1–0)

References

External links

1990 births
Living people
Russian male tennis players
Tennis players from Moscow